Lothingland was a rural district in East Suffolk, England, named after the ancient half-hundred of Lothingland which was merged with Mutford half-hundred in 1763 to form Mutford and Lothingland.

The rural district was formed in 1934 by the merger of most of Mutford and Lothingland Rural District along with part of Blything Rural District, both of which were being abolished.   It covered a coastal area between Great Yarmouth and Lowestoft.

The district was abolished in 1974 under the Local Government Act 1972, and split between the new districts of borough of Great Yarmouth (in Norfolk) and the district of Waveney, in Suffolk.

Statistics

Parishes
Parishes formerly in Blything RD: Benacre, Covehithe, Easton Bavents, Frostenden, Henham, Henstead, Reydon, South Cove, Uggeshall, Wangford, Wrentham.

Formerly in Mutford and Lothingland RD: Ashby, Barnby, Belton, Blundeston, Bradwell, Burgh Castle, Carlton Colville, Corton, Flixton (Lothingland), Fritton, Gisleham, Herringfleet, Hopton on Sea, Kessingland, Lound, Mutford, Oulton, Rushmere, Somerleyton.

References

Districts of England abolished by the Local Government Act 1972
History of Suffolk
History of Norfolk
Borough of Great Yarmouth
Waveney District